George Morris may refer to:

Entertainment
 George L. K. Morris (1905–1975), American abstract painter
 George Pope Morris (1802–1864), American poet and publisher
 George S. Morris (musician) (1876–1958), Scottish composer and singer of cornkisters
 George Taylor Morris (1947–2009), American disc jockey and radio personality
 George Redmond Morris, 4th Baron Killanin (born 1947), Irish film producer

Politics
 George Morris (MP) (1833–1912), MP for Galway Borough
 George Morris (Australian politician) (1892–1967), member of the Queensland Legislative Assembly
 George Morris (New Zealand politician) (1840–1903), New Zealand politician

Sports
 George Morris (American football, born 1931) (1931–2007), American football center and linebacker
 George Morris (halfback) (1919–1999), NFL halfback
 George Morris (footballer) (1874–?), English footballer active in the 1890s/1900s
 George Morris (umpire) (born 1957), New Zealand cricket umpire
 George H. Morris (born 1938), American trainer and judge of horses
 George Lockwood Morris (1859–1947), ironfounder and Wales international rugby player

Other
 George Morris (American writer) (1903-1997), American writer and labor editor
 George Elliott Morris, American journalist
 George Franklin Morris (1866–1953), U.S. federal judge
 George Henry Morris (1872–1914), first commanding officer to lead an Irish Guards battalion into battle
 George Mortimer Morris (1871–1954), British Indian Army officer during the First World War
 George Q. Morris (1874–1962), American leader in The Church of Jesus Christ of Latter-day Saints
 George Sylvester Morris (1840–1889), American educator and philosophical writer